The 1998–99 Sporting de Gijón season was the first season of the club in Segunda División after its last relegation from La Liga, beating the record of less points in a season and the record of most games without earning a win.

Overview
Four coaches managed the team in a very tough season, where the club did not win any league match until the round 9.

Antonio López Habas started managing the team until he was sacked after the round 6. José Antonio Redondo was the caretaker during two weeks until Dutch Aad de Mos arrived to take the helm of the team. He was sacked after the round 19, being substituted by Pedro Braojos, who finally ended the season.

After the end of the season, Juan Carlos Ablanedo retired from football. The goalkeeper played 401 league games with Sporting de Gijón.

Squad

From the youth squad

Competitions

La Liga

Results by round

League table

Matches

Copa del Rey

Matches

Squad statistics

Appearances and goals

|}

References

External links
Profile at BDFutbol
Official website

Sporting de Gijón seasons
Sporting de Gijon